Cordel Patricia Jack (born 22 February 1982) is a Vincentian former cricketer who played as an all-rounder, batting right-handed and bowling right-arm off break. Between 2005 and 2010, she appeared in 20 One Day Internationals and 13 Twenty20 Internationals for the West Indies. She played domestic cricket for Saint Vincent and the Grenadines and Windward Islands.

References

External links

1982 births
Living people
Saint Vincent and the Grenadines women cricketers
West Indies women One Day International cricketers
West Indies women Twenty20 International cricketers
West Indian women cricketers
Windward Islands women cricketers